Pierre Djédji Amondji is the former governor (mayor) of Abidjan, the largest city in Ivory Coast. He served from 2002 to 2006. He is a member of the Ivorian Popular Front party.

See also
 Timeline of Abidjan, 2000s

References

Year of birth missing (living people)
Living people
Mayors of places in Ivory Coast
Ivorian Popular Front politicians
People from Abidjan
Place of birth missing (living people)